Rémy Stricker (3 January 1936 – 19 November 2019) was a French pianist, music educator, radio producer, musicologist and writer.

Biography 
Born in Mulhouse, Rémy Stricker studied the piano with Yvonne Lefébure, then at the Conservatoire de Paris. Before being a professor of musical esthetics at the Conservatoire de Paris from 1971 to 2001, Rémy Stricker was a radio producer for France Musique and France Culture from 1962 to 1997.

In 2004, he was awarded the prix spécial du jury of the Prix des Muses for his book Berlioz dramaturge.

Selected publications 
1969: Musique du Baroque, Gallimard, .
1980: Mozart et ses opéras : fiction et vérité, series Bibliothèque des Idées , Gallimard, 355p.
1993: Franz Liszt, les ténèbres de la gloire, series Bibliothèque des Idées, NRF – Gallimard, 482 p. 
1996: 
1996: les Mélodies de Duparc, Actes Sud .
1999: Georges Bizet : 1838-1875, Gallimard, Paris, 377 p. .
2001: Le dernier Beethoven, series Bibliothèque des Idées, Gallimard, 328 p. 
2003: Berlioz dramaturge, series Bibliothèque des Idées, Gallimard, 664 p.

Bibliography 
 Laurent Herz, Les Musigrains, une institution pédagogique et musicale (1939–1986), Éditions L'Harmattan, Paris, 2013

References

External links 
 Rémy Stricker on Babelio
 Rémy Stricker on Symétrie
 Rémy Stricker at Gallimard
 Publications of Rémy Stricker at Cairn info
 Rémy Stricker at Encyclopédie Larousse 
 Rémy STRICKER at Actes Sud
 Rémy Stricker, musicologue: Chez elle, l'humilité ouvre la voie à l'humanité on La Croix (6 June 2009)

1936 births
2019 deaths
Conservatoire de Paris alumni
Academic staff of the Conservatoire de Paris
French radio producers
20th-century French musicologists
21st-century French musicologists
French bibliographers
Chevaliers of the Ordre des Arts et des Lettres
Chevaliers of the Légion d'honneur
Musicians from Mulhouse
20th-century French male classical pianists
21st-century French male classical pianists
Mass media people from Mulhouse